Tony Clarke (born 1944) is a Canadian activist.

Biography
Clarke grew up in Chilliwack, British Columbia, graduating from Chilliwack Senior Secondary School in 1962.  He was class president.  He studied at the University of British Columbia and did graduate work at the University of Chicago, obtaining a PhD in the history of religion. He presented a dissertation titled The Color Line and the American Metropolis: A Search for a Form of Ministry in the Aftermath of the Civil Rights Movement in Chicago (1974). After Chicago, he worked for the Canadian Conference of Catholic Bishops for 21 years, serving as Director of Social Policy.

Clarke was the chair of the Action Canada Network,  a coalition of labor groups and activists that led the battle against the 1987 Canada-United States Free Trade Agreement. The activists joined forces with anti-free traders from Mexico and the United States to oppose the North American Free Trade Agreement. As a result of his leadership role in the anti-free trade movement, Clarke was fired from the Conference of Bishops. Clarke then wrote Behind the Mitre: The Moral Leadership Crisis in the Canadian Catholic Church (Toronto: HarperCollins, 1995), analyzing the role of the Catholic Church and church-state relations in the previous two decades.

Clarke has continued his activism, working closely with Maude Barlow of the Council of Canadians. In 1997 he formed the Polaris Institute. and led the campaigns against the Multilateral Agreement on Investment, the Asia-Pacific Economic Cooperation, and the World Trade Organization.

As a result of his activist work, he and Maude Barlow were awarded the 2005 Right Livelihood Award "for their exemplary and longstanding worldwide work for trade justice and the recognition of the fundamental human right to water".

 Clarke sits on the board of directors of the International Forum on Globalization. His daughter is actor and artist Tanya Clarke.

Books 
Clarke has authored several books:
Behind the Mitre: The Moral leadership Crisis in the Canadian Catholic Church (1995)
Silent Coup:Confronting the Big Business Takeover of Canada (1997)
MAI: The Multilateral Agreement on Investment & the Threat to Canadian Sovereignty (1997) with Maude Barlow
MAI: The Multilateral Agreement on Investment & the Threat to American Democracy (1998) with Maude Barlow
MAI Round 2: New Global And Internal Threats to Canadian Sovereignty (1998) with Maude Barlow
Global Showdown: How the new Activists are Fighting Global Corporate Rule(2001) with Maude Barlow
Challenging McWorld (2001 with Sara Dopp; revised and updated 2006)
Blue Gold: The Fight to Stop the Corporate Theft of the World's Water (2003) with Maude Barlow
Inside the Bottle: Exposing the Bottled Water Industry (2005 revised and updated in 2007)
Tar Sands Showdown: Canada and the New politics of Oil in an Age of Climate Change (2008)
Getting to Zero: Canada Confronts Global Warming (2018)

Films 
Clarke stars in the feature documentary Blue Gold: World Water Wars by Sam Bozzo. He is also featured in a documentary on the tar sands, H2OIL by Shannon Walsh.

See also 
Mitch Daniels
Thomas Homer-Dixon
Mike Hudema
Emily Hunter
Nikolai Kudryavtsev
Andrew Nikiforuk

References

External links 
Information on Right Livelihood Award website
Video interview 

1944 births
Living people
Canadian activists
People from Chilliwack